"Hyper Hyper" is a song by German band Scooter, released in May 1994 as the first single from their debut album, ... and the Beat Goes On! (1995). It was sold in three versions: two of the versions had the same track listings, but different covers. The song was one of the most successful dance hits of 1994. The original "Hyper Hyper" quotes were taken from Ultra-Sonic's 1993 track "Annihilating Rhythm (Do you love your hardcore?)", licensed to Low Spirit Records/Polydor. Ultra-Sonic receive a "big shout" in the lyrics of the song, as do a further thirty DJs who were popular in Germany in the mid-1990s.

Critical reception
Pan-European magazine Music & Media wrote, "In the wake of massive successes by DJs-turned-performers such as Marusha, Sven Väth, Westbam and Jam & Spoon, a new star is born. Produced by, a highly successful remixer collective, all ingredients are present to emulate the success of the aforementioned." They also described it as "hilarious" and "instantly catchy", noting that the track "deftly fused hardcore with a razor-sharp pop sensibility."

Music video
The accompanying music video for "Hyper Hyper" was directed by Plastic Reality. It was A-listed on Germany's VIVA in October 1994.

Track listings

Charts

Weekly charts

Year-end charts

Certifications

Covers
The song was covered by Modeselektor and Otto Von Schirach on the Modeselektor album Happy Birthday!.

The song was covered again in 2011, entitled "Hacker Hacker", by the German hacker FX of Phenoelit (who provided the lyrics adaptation) and DJ Dom Williams (Phonoelit, TimeCoderz), on the occasion of the last official ph-neutral 0x7db, a Berlin hacker and computer security conference. In this version of the song, the shout-outs go out to 30 more or less famous hackers, researchers and information security professionals.

References

1994 singles
1994 songs
English-language German songs
Scooter (band) songs
Songs written by H.P. Baxxter
Songs written by Jens Thele
Songs written by Rick J. Jordan